Ernst Rufli (12 April 1910 – 14 August 1996) was a Swiss rower who competed at the 1936 Summer Olympics.

Rufli was born in 1910. He was initially a goalkeeper for FC Zürich but changed to rowing and sculled for Ruderclub Zürich. In 1935 and 1936 he won the Diamond Challenge Sculls at Henley Royal Regatta in England. Rufli came fifth in the single scull rowing for Switzerland at the 1936 Summer Olympics in Berlin.

References

1910 births
1996 deaths
Swiss male rowers
Olympic rowers of Switzerland
Rowers at the 1936 Summer Olympics
European Rowing Championships medalists
20th-century Swiss people